Abū Bakr, ‘Abd al-Qāhir ibn ‘Abd ar-Raḥmān ibn Muḥammad al-Jurjānī  (10091078 or 1081 AD [400 – 471 or 474 A.H.]); nicknamed "Al-Naḥawī" (the grammarian), he was a renowned Persian grammarian of the Arabic language, literary theorist of the Muslim Shafi'i, and a follower of al-Ash'ari. He wrote several celebrated works on grammar and rhetoric, among these are Mi,ut Ạmil and Al-Jumal - introductions to Arabic syntax - and a commentary titled Al-Mughnī in three volumes.

Al-Jurjānī is said to have never left his native town of Gorgan, Iran, yet his reputation in the twin sciences of ilm al balaghah (eloquence and rhetorical art) and ilm al bayan (a branch of Arabic rhetoric dealing with metaphorical language), reached many Arabic scholars who travelled to see him.  His two books on these subjects, Asrār al-Balāghah (Secrets of Rhetoric), and Dalāʾīl al-ʿIjāz fi-l-Qurʾān (Arguments of the Miraculous Inimitability of the Quran) show influences of al-Jurjānī's predecessors, the grammarian Sibawayh, the critic Abi Helal al-'Askari al Balaghi, and the linguist and literary theorist Abu Ali al-Farisi, the author of al-Idah (Elucidation).
Ali al-Farisi's nephew, Abi al-Hussein Muhammad ibn al-Hassan ibn Abd al-Wareth al-Faressi al-Nawawi, was al-Jurjānī's teacher, under whom he studied the al-Idah, and on which he wrote a thirty-volume work of commentary entitled al Maghna fi Sharh al-Idah .

Critical opinions

Publications 
 
 Asrār al-Balāghah (The Secrets of Elucidation)
 Al-Awāmil al-Mi’ah (The Hundred Elements) - A short text on 100 modifiers, or particles, in Arabic and their different uses with examples.
 Dalā’il al-Iʿjaz (Intimations of Inimitability)
 Iʿjaz al-Qur’ān (The inimitability of the Qur'an)
 Al-Jumal (Sentences)
 Kitab ʿArūd (Poetic Structure)
 Al-Maghna fī Sharḥ al-Idah’, thirty volumes
 Al-Miftāḥ (The Key)
 Muʿjam al-taʿrifāt (Compendium of Definitions)
 Al-Muqtasad, a short version of Al Maghna.
 Sharḥ al-Fātiḥa fī Mujallad (Explaining Al-Fatiha in a Volume)
 Al-Talkhiss bi Sharḥihi (The Brief of Sentence Elucidation)
 Al-'Umhad fī al-Taṣrīf (The Basis of Morphology)
 An anthology collection on the works of Abi-tammam, al-Buh'turi, and al-Mutannabī.

References

Bibliography

External links

"Summary of Disagreements Between at-Taftazani and al-Jurrujani" is an Arabic work, dating from 1805, which compares Abd al-Qahir al-Jurjani's work to the work of Taftazani
 

Year of birth unknown
1000s births
1078 deaths
Iranian Arabic-language writers
11th-century Persian-language writers
Iranian grammarians
Religious writers
11th-century Iranian people
People from Gorgan